Corambe is a genus of sea slugs, dorid nudibranchs, marine gastropod molluscs in family Corambidae within the superfamily Onchidoridoidea.

Species in this genus show a characteristic posterior notch in the notum (which is lacking in some taxa) and a characteristic gill morphology, especially the presence of ventral gills.

Habitat 
These nudibranchs occur in littoral and sublittoral temperate waters of the northern and southern hemispheres.

General description 
They are mostly small (between 5 and 10 mm) and rather hard to find because they are very well camouflaged. They prey on encrusting bryozoans.

Species 
Species within the genus Corambe include:
 Corambe burchi (Er. Marcus & Ev. Marcus, 1967)
 Corambe carambola  Er. Marcus, 1955
 Corambe evelinae Er. Marcus, 1958
 Corambe lucea Er. Marcus, 1959 
 Corambe mancorensis Martynov, Brenzinger, Hooker & Schrödl, 2011
 Corambe obscura (A. E. Verrill, 1870)
 Corambe osculabundus Ortea & Caballer, 2018
 Corambe pacifica MacFarland & O'Donoghue, 1929
 Corambe sp. crazed nudibranch
 Corambe steinbergae (Lance, 1962)   (synonym of Doridella steinbergae  (Lance, 1962))
 Corambe testudinaria H. Fischer, 1889

Species synonymised or transferred to other genera
 Corambe baratariae (Harry, 1953): synonym of Corambe obscura
 Corambe batava  Kerbert, 1886: synonym of Corambe obscura (A. E. Verrill, 1870)
 Corambe depressa Adams, 1847 
 Corambe fusca  Adams, 1847 
 Corambe sargassicola  Bergh, 1871  (type species): synonym of  Corambe obscura
 Corambe thompsoni  Millen & Nybakken, 1991: synonym of Loy thompsoni (Millen & Nybakken, 1991)
In 1994 it became a synonym of Psammodoris thompsoni  (Millen &  Nybakken, 1991)  and in 1998 synonym of Loy thompsoni (Millen & Nybakken, 1991).

References

 Bergh, L. S. R. (1869). Bidrag til kundskab om Phyllidierne, en anatomisk undersogelse. Naturhistorisk Tidsskrift. ser. 3, 5(3): 357–542, pls 14–24.
 Gofas, S.; Le Renard, J.; Bouchet, P. (2001). Mollusca. in: Costello, M.J. et al. (eds), European Register of Marine Species: a check-list of the marine species in Europe and a bibliography of guides to their identification. Patrimoines Naturels. 50: 180-213.
 Martynov A. & Schrödl M. (2011) Phylogeny and evolution of corambid nudibranchs (Mollusca: Gastropoda). Zoological Journal of the Linnean Society 163: 585-604.
A rare new species of Corambe Bergh, 1869 (Mollusca: Gastropoda:Nudibranchia) from the Caribbean Sea, with a review of the taxonomical history of the Corambidae Bergh, 1871. Marine Biodiversity

External links
 http://www.catalogueoflife.org accessed 25 August 2009

 Verrill A.E. 1870. Contributions to zoölogy from the museum of Yale College. Nº 8.– Descriptions of some New England Nudibranchiata. American Journal of Science and Arts, (2) 50: 405-408.
 Sea Slug Forum species list

Corambidae